A sunbreak is a natural phenomenon in which sunlight obscured over a relatively large area penetrates the obscuring material in a localized space.  The typical example is of sunlight shining through a hole in cloud cover.  A sunbreak piercing clouds normally produces a visible shaft of light reflected by atmospheric dust and or moisture, called a sunbeam.  Another form of sunbreak occurs when sunlight passes into an area otherwise shadowed by surrounding large buildings through a gap temporarily aligned with the position of the sun.

The word is considered by some to have origins in Pacific Northwest English.

In art

Artists such as cartoonists and filmmakers often use sunbreak to show protection or relief being brought upon an area of land by God or a receding storm.

References

Earth phenomena
Light
Sun